Camille Bordas is a French writer and academic. She is an assistant professor at the University of Florida and her writing has been published in The New Yorker, The Paris Review, Tin House, Chicago Magazine, and LitHub.

Bordas was born in France and grew up in Mexico. She moved to the United States in 2012 to be with her husband, Adam Levin, who is also a writer.

Bibliography

Novels 
Les treize desserts (2009), winner of the Prix Jean-Claude-Izzo and the Bourse Thyde-Monnier from the Société des gens de lettres.
Partie commune (2011), winner of the Prix du deuxième roman (Prize for a second novel).
How to Behave in a Crowd (2017)

Short fiction 

Stories

References

1987 births
Living people
French women novelists
The New Yorker people
University of Florida faculty
French emigrants to Mexico